This is a list of alumni of Brooklyn College, a senior college of the City University of New York, located in Brooklyn, New York, United States.

Academia

Chancellors, deans, and presidents

Walter Adams (B.A. 1942), economist and President of Michigan State University
Glenn Altschuler (B.A. 1971), Dean of the Cornell University School of Continuing Education and Summer Sessions, noted for his work on the history of American popular culture
Samuel Baskin (B.A. 1942), psychologist and educational reformer and first President of the Union Institute & University
Barbara Aronstein Black (B.A. 1953), Dean at Columbia University School of Law
Carmen Fariña (M.S.Ed. 1968), New York City Schools Chancellor
 Leon M. Goldstein (died 1999), President of Kingsborough Community College, and acting Chancellor of the City University of New York
Alfred Gottschalk (B.A. 1952), President of Hebrew Union College and leader in the Reform Judaism movement
Donald Kagan (B.A. 1954), historian; Dean at Yale University
Jeffrey Kraus (B.A. 1978), Provost and Vice President for Academic Affairs, (Wagner College) 2018-2021
Barry Munitz (B.A. 1963), Chancellor, California State University (1991–98)
Steven Schwartz (B.A. 1967), Vice Chancellor of Macquarie University in Sydney, Australia
Lisa Staiano-Coico, aka Lisa S. Coico (B.S. 1976), president of City College of New York
Robert S. Stone (B.A. 1942), pioneering pathologist; Deans of the University of New Mexico School of Medicine, University of Oregon School of Medicine, and Texas A&M Health Science Center College of Medicine; Director of The National Institutes of Health 1973–1975
Donald P. Zingale (B.A. 1967), president of the State University of New York at Cobleskill

Anthropology

Jerome H. Barkow (B.A. 1964), Canadian anthropologist at Dalhousie University, has made important contributions to the field of evolutionary psychology
Melvin Konner (B.A. 1966), Samuel Candler Dobbs Professor of Anthropology and associate professor of Psychiatry and Neurology at Emory University
Jeffrey Laitman (B.A. 1973), anatomist and physical anthropologist, Distinguished Professor of the Mount Sinai School of Medicine, President-Elect of the American Association of Anatomists
Sidney Mintz (B.A. 1943), anthropologist, known for his studies of Latin America and the Caribbean
Marjorie Shostak (B.A. 1966), anthropologist; specialist in the !Kung San people of the Kalahari desert in south-western Africa
Richard J. Smith (B.A. 1969), Ralph E. Morrow Distinguished Professor of Physical Anthropology at Washington University in St. Louis

Economics
Paul Davidson (B.S. 1950), macroeconomist who has been one of the leading spokesmen of the American branch of the Post Keynesian school in economics
Israel Kirzner (B.A. 1954), economist
David Laibman (M.A. 1969), Professor Emeritus of Economics at Brooklyn College; Editor of Science & Society

History
Ann Marie Adams (B.A. 1999), professor of history at Rutgers University and author of books on race and education, antebellum civil rights movement, and civil rights in 20th-century America
Frank J. Coppa (B.A. 1960), historian, author, and educator who has written widely on the Papacy
Michael S. Cullen (B.A. 1962), historian, journalist and publicist, based in Berlin; credited with inspiring Christo and Jeanne-Claude to wrap the Reichstag
Jules Davids (B.A. 1942), Professor of Diplomatic History at Georgetown University, aided John F. Kennedy in writing Profiles in Courage
Theodore Draper (B.A. 1933), historian and political writer; wrote seminal works on the formative period of the American Communist Party, the Cuban Revolution, and the Iran-Contra Affair
Melvyn Dubofsky (B.A. 1955), professor of history and sociology at the Binghamton University, and a well-known labor historian
Yaffa Eliach (B.A. 1967), historian, author, and scholar of Judaic Studies and the Holocaust
John A. Garraty (B.A. 1941), historian, biographer, and president of the Society of American Historians
Eugene Genovese (B.A. 1953), historian of the American South and American slavery
Stuart D. Goldman (B.A. 1964), historian, author, and scholar in residence at the National Council for Eurasian and East European Research at the Wilson Center in Washington, DC
Judith R. Goodstein (B.A. 1960), historian of science, historian of mathematics, book author, and University Archivist Emeritus at the California Institute of Technology
Greg Grandin (B.A. 1991), historian; professor of history at New York University; winner of the 2020 Pulitzer Prize for History
Oscar Handlin (B.A. 1934), Carl M. Loeb University Professor Emeritus, Harvard University; winner of the Pulitzer Prize in history, author
Gertrude Himmelfarb (B.A. 1942), historian and conservative cultural critic
Elisheva Carlebach Jofen (B.A. 1976), scholar of early modern Jewish history
David Kranzler (B.A. 1953), historian specializing in the rescue of Jews during the Holocaust
Aileen S. Kraditor (B.A. 1950) American historian, specializing in the history of feminism
Moses Rischin (B.A. 1947), Jewish historian and Emeritus Professor of History at San Francisco State University
Michele R. Salzman (B.A. 1973),  Classicist at the University of California, Riverside, scholar of the religious and social history of Late Antiquity
Albert A. Sicroff (B.A. 1940), Hispanist, Professor of Spanish, Queens College
Joel H. Silbey (B.A. 1955), historian and President White Professor of History at Cornell University
Richard Slotkin (B.A. 1963), cultural critic and historian of the Western United States
Clarence Taylor (B.A. 1975), professor emeritus of History at Baruch College and author of books on racism, religion, and civil rights in 20th-century America

Law

Alan S. Becker (B.A. 1966), Attorney, member of the Florida House of Representatives, 1972–1978
Jules Coleman (B.A. 1968), scholar of law and jurisprudence and the Wesley Newcomb Hohfeld Professor of Jurisprudence and Professor of Philosophy at Yale Law School
Alan M. Dershowitz (B.A. 1959), Harvard Law School professor and author
Stephen Gillers (B.A. 1964), New York University School of Law professor and expert in legal ethics
Gerald Gunther (A.B. 1949), William Nelson Cromwell Professor of Law at Stanford Law School, among the 20 most widely cited legal scholars of the 20th century
Mary Noe (B.A. 1982), educator; writer; lecturer; Assistant Professor of Law, division of Criminal Justice and Legal Studies, St. John's University

Mathematics

Anatole Beck (B.A. 1951), mathematician, known for his Linear search problem
Paul Cohen (1953), winner of the Fields Medal
Violet Haas (B.A. 1947), American applied mathematician specializing in control theory and optimal estimation; professor of electrical engineering at Purdue
Elaine Koppelman (B.A. 1957), mathematician; James Beall Professor of Mathematics at Goucher College
Allen R Miller (B.S. 1965), mathematician and major contributor to the field of special functions, especially confluent hypergeometric functions
Teri Perl (B.A. 1947), American mathematics educator, co-founder of The Learning Company, pioneering educational software publisher
Richard M. Pollack (B.A. 1956), geometer and Professor Emeritus at the Courant Institute of New York University; founding co-editor of the journal Discrete and Computational Geometry
Irving Reiner (B.A. 1944), mathematician, dealt with representation theory of algebras and groups, and number theory
Theodore J. Rivlin (B.A. 1948), mathematician, specializing in approximation theory
Donald Solitar (B.A. 1953), American/Canadian mathematician, known for his work in combinatorial group theory
Henry Wallman (B.S. 1933), mathematician, known for his work in lattice theory, dimension theory, topology, and electronic circuit design
Gerard Washnitzer (B.S. 1947), mathematician

Philosophy
Allan Gotthelf (B.A. 1963), professor of philosophy at the University of Pittsburgh and specialist in Objectivism and Aristotle
Eli Hirsch (B.A. 1960), philosopher, the Charles Goldman Professor of Philosophy at Brandeis University
Christia Mercer (B.A. 1974), Gustave M. Berne Professor in the Department of Philosophy at Columbia University
Jay Newman (B.A. 1973), philosopher concerned with the philosophy of religion, philosophy of culture, and the ethics of mass communication
Ben-Ami Scharfstein (B.A. 1939), prominent Israeli philosopher; winner of the 2005 Israel Prize
Israel Scheffler (B.A. 1945), philosopher of science and education
Eli Uncyk (B.A., cum laude, 1967); Articles Editor, N.Y.U Law School Journal of International Law and Politics, attorney

Political science
Ada Finifter (B.A. 1959) American political scientist specializing in American public opinion and voting behavior
Dennis Hale (M.A. 1969), political scientist; Associate Professor of Political Science at Boston College
Milton Heumann (B.A. 1968), Professor of Political Science at Rutgers University
Ruth Mandel (B.A. 1960), Professor of political scientist, director of the Eagleton Institute of Politics at Rutgers University
Marvin Schick (B.A. 1956), Hunter College and New School for Social Research political science and constitutional law professor, known for his work in Jewish education
Mitchell A. Seligson (B.A. 1967) Centennial Professor Emeritus of Political Science at Vanderbilt University, founder of  the Latin American Public Opinion Project
Aaron Wildavsky (B.A. 1954), political scientist

Sociology

Helen A. Berger (B.A. 1971), American sociologist known for her studies of the Pagan community in the United States
Joseph Berger (B.A. 1949), theoretical sociologist and senior fellow at the Hoover Institution
Leo Bogart (B.A 1941), sociologist, media and marketing expert
Helen Fein (B.A. 1955), historical sociologist, professor, specialized on genocide, human rights, collective violence and other issues
Omar Lizardo (B.A. 1997), sociologist and LeRoy Neiman Term  chair Professor of Sociology at UCLA
Seymour M. Miller (B.A. 1943), economic-political sociologist, activist, and emeritus professor of sociology at Boston University

Other

Joyce Sparer Adler (B.A. 1935), critic, playwright, teacher and Melville scholar
William Alfred (B.A. 1948), playwright and professor of English literature at Harvard University
Evelyn Torton Beck (B.A. 1954), scholar and activist who specializes in Women's Studies, Jewish Women's Studies, and Lesbian Studies
Livia Bitton-Jackson (B.A. 1961) academic, author and a Holocaust survivor
 J. David Bleich (born 1936), rabbi and authority on Jewish law and ethics
Zvi Bodie (B.A. 1965), Boston University Norman and Adele Barron Professor of Management and expert in pension finance
Eva Brann (B.A. 1950), longest-serving tutor (1957–present) at St. John's College, Annapolis and a 2005 recipient of the National Humanities Medal
Jules Chametzky (B.A. 1950), literary critic, writer, editor, and unionist
Jonathan Chaves (B.A. 1965), Professor of Chinese Language and Literature at the George Washington University and translator of Classical Chinese poetry
Patricia Cronin (M.F.A. 1995), Rome Prize-winning feminist visual artist. 
Doris Malkin Curtis (B.S. 1933), paleontologist, stratigrapher, geologist and first woman president of the Geological Society of America
Dorothy Dinnerstein (B.A. 1943), feminist academic and activist
Kenneth B. Eisenthal (B.A. 1954), Mark Hyman Professor of Chemistry Chair at Columbia University and pioneering physical chemist
Sandra Feldman (B.A 1960), President, American Federation of Teachers
Aryeh Frimer (B.A. 1968), Professor of Chemistry at Bar-Ilan University
Marilyn Gittell (B.A. 1952), education reformer, founder of the Urban Affairs Review
Marc Goldstein (B.S. 1968), urologist and the Matthew P. Hardy Distinguished Professor of Reproductive Medicine, and Urology at Weill Cornell Medical College of Cornell University
Martin Haberman (B.A. 1953), educator and Distinguished Professor at the University of Wisconsin–Milwaukee who developed interviewing techniques for identifying teachers and principals who will be successful in working with poor children.
Linda Heywood (B. A. 1973), professor of African American studies and history at the University of Boston
Raul Hilberg (B.A. 1948), Austrian-born American political scientist and historian, author of The Destruction of the European Jews (1961)
Zoia Horn (B.A. 1939), first librarian ever jailed for refusing to divulge information that violated her belief in intellectual freedom
Ellis Horowitz (B.S. 1964), computer scientist and Professor of Computer Science and Electrical Engineering at the University of Southern California (USC)
Paul Ilie (B.A. 1954), specialist in modern and contemporary Spanish literature
Eva Kollisch (B.A. 1951), writer, literary scholar, pacifist and feminist
Annette Kolodny (B.A. 1962), feminist literary critic and activist
Sheldon Krimsky (B.S. 1963), Professor of Urban and Environmental Policy and Planning at Tufts University
Joel Lebowitz (B.A. 1952), mathematical physicist acknowledged for his contributions to statistical physics and statistical mechanics, George William Hill Professor of Mathematics and Physics at Rutgers University
Sandra Leiblum (B.A. 1965), author, lecturer, and researcher in sexology
Leslie Libow (B.A. 1954), professor of geriatrics and palliative medicine at the Icahn Mount Sinai School of Medicine, author of one of the first geriatric-medicine textbooks in the United States
Edith H. Luchins (B.A. 1942), Gestalt psychologist and mathematician; first female professor at the Rensselaer Polytechnic Institute
Nancy Lynch (B.A. 1968), mathematician and professor at the Massachusetts Institute of Technology; winner of the 2007 Knuth Prize for contributions to the foundations of computer science
Leonard Mirman (B.A. 1963), mathematician and economist at the University of Virginia, known for his contributions to economics of uncertainty
Joseph Natoli (B.A. 1966), academic, known for works on postmodernism
Cindy Nemser (B.A. 1959, M.A. 1964), art historian and writer; founder and editor of the Feminist Art Journal
John Parascandola (B.A. 1963), medical historian
Alan W. Pollack (B.A. 1970), musicologist, known for having musically analyzed every Beatles song released
Ellen Prince (B.A. 1964), linguist; President of the Linguistic Society of America; pioneer in linguistic pragmatics
Dennis Raphael (B.S. 1972), health policy professor at York University in Toronto
Buddy Ratner(B.S. 1967), professor of chemical engineering and bioengineering and director of the Research Center for Biomaterials at the University of Washington
Stuart A. Rice (B.S. 1952), physical chemist, Frank P. Hixon Distinguished Service Professor Emeritus at the University of Chicago, Wolf Prize in Chemistry
Robert Rosen (B.A. 1955), theoretical biologist and Professor of Biophysics at Dalhousie University
Jack M. Sasson (B.A. 1962), emeritus Mary Jane Werthan Professor of Jewish Studies and Hebrew Bible at Vanderbilt Divinity School whose research focuses primarily on Assyriology and Hebrew Scriptures
Allen Schick (B.A. 1956), governance fellow of the Brookings Institution, professor of political science at the Maryland School of Public Policy of University of Maryland, College Park and founding editor of the journal, Public Budgeting and Finance
Ivan Schulman (B.A. 1953), major scholar of Spanish American Modernismo and the leading US scholar of the works of José Martí.
Salvatore J. Stolfo (B.S. 1974), professor of computer science at Columbia University and an expert in computer security
Albert Szabo (B.A. 1948), architect, educator, artist, and professor of architecture at the Harvard Graduate School of Design
Robert H. Tamarin (B.A. 1963), emeritus professor of biology, former Dean of the College of Sciences at the University of Massachusetts; developed radioisotope, electrophoretic and DNA fingerprinting techniques for use in the study of small mammals
Jay Tischfield (B.A. 1967), MacMillan Professor and the Chair of the Department of Genetics at Rutgers University
Frank P. Tomasulo (B.A. 1967), film professor, author, and academic administrator at Ithaca College, Georgia State University, Southern Methodist University, and Florida State University; Editor-in-Chief of Journal of Film & Video and Cinema Journal
Edward Baron Turk (B.A. 1967), author, arts critic, and educator who writes mainly on the culture of France
Regina Weinreich (B.A. 1970), writer, journalist, teacher, and scholar of the artists of the Beat Generation
Bruce Winick (B.A. 1965), the Silvers-Rubenstein Distinguished Professor of Law and Professor of Psychiatry and Behavioral Sciences at the University of Miami and theorist on mental health law
Jitu Weusi (M.S. 1996), American educator, community leader, writer, activist, and jazz and arts promoter.
Joel B. Wolowelsky (B.S. 1967), Modern Orthodox rabbi, professor, author, and dean of faculty at the Yeshiva of Flatbush high school
Frieda Zames (B.A. 1954), disability rights activist and mathematics professor
Rose Zimbardo (B.A., 1956), professor of English literature

Business

Fred Bass (B.A. 1949), owner of New York City's Strand Bookstore
Charles Biderman (B.A. 1967), founder and CEO of TrimTabs Investment Research, Inc.
Joseph Cassano (B.A. 1977), head of Financial Product division at American International Group 1987–2008
Bruce Chizen (B.S. 1978), President and CEO of Adobe Systems
Bernard Cornfeld (B.A. 1950), businessman and international financier, sold investments in mutual funds
Robert A. Daly, CEO of Warner Bros. and Los Angeles Dodgers
Benjamin Eisenstadt (B.A. 1954), creator of Sweet'N Low, designer of the modern sugar packet, and the founder of Cumberland Packing Corporation
Irwin Federman (B.S. 1956), businessman, philanthropist and General Partner of U.S. Venture Partners
Jerry Della Femina (A.A. 1957), chairman and CEO, Della Femina, Jeary and Partners
Richard LaMotta (B.A. 1969), inventor and principal promoter of the Chipwich ice cream sandwich
Marjorie Magner (B.S. 1969), Chairman of Gannett
Jerry Moss (B.A. 1957), co-founder of A&M Records
Ira Rennert (B.A. 1955), billionaire investor and businessman
Steve Riggio (B.A. 1974), CEO of Barnes & Noble, Inc.
George H. Ross (B.A. 1951), Executive Vice President and Senior Counsel of the Trump Organization
Barry Salzberg (B.S. 1974), chief executive officer Deloitte, member of Deloitte's U.S. board of directors, the Deloitte Touche Tohmatsu Global Executive Committee, the DTT Global board of directors, Deloitte LLP
Richard L. Sandor (B.A. 1962), businessman, economist, and entrepreneur, recognized as the "father of financial futures"
Leonard Tow (B.A. 1950), chairman and CEO of Citizens Communications
Charlie Shrem (B.A. 2012), co-founder and CEO of the Bitcoin startup company BitInstant
Agnes Varis (B.A. 1950), President and founder of Agvar Chemicals Inc. and Aegis Pharmaceuticals
Lester Wunderman (B.A. 1938), advertising executive considered the creator of modern-day direct marketing
Sigi Ziering (B.S. 1953), German-born American business executive, playwright and philanthropist

Entertainment

Letty Aronson (B.A. 1964), film producer; sister of Woody Allen
Obba Babatundé (B.A. 1974), Emmy and Tony Award-nominated actor
Sandy Baron (B.A. 1957), comedian, stage, film, and television actor
Saul Bass, graphic designer and filmmaker, won the Academy Award for Documentary Short Subject
Sarah Benson (M.F.A.), theatre director, artistic director of SoHo Rep
Alvin Boretz (B.A. 1942), television writer for GE Theater, Playhouse 90, Armstrong Circle Theatre, Dr. Kildare, The Defenders, and Kojak
Mel Brooks (born Melvin Kaminsky; 1946), Academy Award, Emmy Award, and Tony Award-winning director, writer, and actor
Henry Chan (M.S. 1973), film and television director
Jordan Charney (B.A. 1961), character actor
Dominic Chianese (B.A. 1961), film, television and theatre actor, known for his role as Corrado "Junior" Soprano on the HBO TV series The Sopranos
Joan Cullman (born Joan Paley), Tony Award Broadway producer
Jon Cypher (B.A. 1953), actor, known for his role as Chief of Police Fletcher Daniels in the police drama Hill Street Blues
Alfred Drake (B.A. 1936), musical theater actor and singer
Joel Eisenberg (B.A. 1985), author, screenwriter, and producer
James Franco (M.F.A. 2010), Golden Globe Award-winning film and TV actor, author
Richard Frankel (B.A. 1968), six-time Tony Award-winning theatrical producer
Devery Freeman (B.A. 1935), prolific screenwriter, novelist and union activist who helped to establish the Writers Guild of America
Takeshi Fukunaga (B.A. 2007), Japanese filmmaker; Out of My Hand
Philip S. Goodman (B.A. 1948), screenwriter, producer, and director
Erica Hayden (M.A. 2008), radio personality, television host and psychotherapist
Tijana Ibrahimovic (B.A. 2008), Serbian entertainment journalist and TV personality
C. Bernard Jackson (B.A. 1948), playwright who founded the Inner City Cultural Center in Los Angeles
Marvin Kaplan (B.A. 1947), character actor, president of Los Angeles chapter of American Federation of Television and Radio Artists 1989–95; 2003–05
Robert Kerman (B.A. 1970), actor
Woodie King, Jr. (M.F.A. 1999), director and producer of stage and screen, and founding director of the New Federal Theatre
Mousa Kraish (B.A. 1998), actor and director
Tuli Kupferberg (B.A. 1948), counterculture poet, author, cartoonist, pacifist anarchist, publisher and co-founder of the band The Fugs
Jean-Claude La Marre (B.A. 1992), Haitian-American writer, director, and film and television actor
Obafemi Lasode (M.A. 1984), Nigerian veteran film actor, songwriter, playwright, film producer and director
Ken Lerner (B.A. 1970), television and film actor
Michael Lerner (B.A. 1962), Academy Award-nominated actor
Edie Locke, editor-in chief of Mademoiselle
Michael Lynne (B.A. 1961), co-founder and CEO of New Line Cinema
Steve Malzberg (B.A. 1982), conservative radio broadcaster and host of The Steve Malzberg Show on the WOR Radio Network
Paul Mazursky (B.A. 1951), Academy Award-nominated filmmaker, known for An Unmarried Woman, Harry and Tonto and Down and Out in Beverly Hills, among others; producer; actor
Neil Meron (B.A. 1976), film producer, won Academy Award for Chicago in 2003
Jared Mezzocchi (M.F.A. 2009), multimedia theater director, theatrical designer
Bruce Morrow (born Bruce Meyerowitz) (Attended), known as Cousin Brucie, radio performer, National Radio Hall of Fame
Oren Moverman (B.A. 1992), Academy Award-nominated filmmaker
Larry Namer (B.A. 1971), founder of E! Entertainment TV Network
Barry Oringer (B.A. 1958), prolific producer and screenwriter
Eric Overmyer (M.F.A. 1982), television writer and producer; The Wire
Gil Portes (M.S. 1971), award-winning Filipino film director, film producer and screenwriter
Richard Portnow (B.A. 1967), actor, known for recurring role in The Sopranos
Dennis Prager (B.A. 1970), syndicated radio talk show host, columnist, author, ethicist, and public speaker, founder of PragerU.
Brian "Q" Quinn, comedian, stars in the popular TV show Impractical Jokers
Mark Rappaport (B.A. 1964), independent/underground film director
David Rayfiel (B.A. 1947), screenwriter, frequent collaborator of director Sydney Pollack
Richard Reicheg (B.A. 1962, MA 1973), actor, folk singer, and songwriter, known for the song "Looking for an Echo"
Jason Reischel (M.A. 2016), singer-songwriter who sometimes goes by the stage name My Cousin, The Emperor. 
Howard Rosenman (B.A. 1965), producer and motion picture executive
Marc Salem (B.A. 1975), mentalist and mind reader
George Schindler (B.A. 1952), stage magician, magic consultant, and ventriloquist, "lifetime dean" of the Society of American Magicians
Steve Schirripa (B.A. 1980), actor known for his role as Bobby Baccalieri on the HBO TV series The Sopranos
Citizen Kafka (Richard Shulberg), (B.A. 1969), radio personality and folk musician
Roger S. H. Schulman (B.A. 1980), film and television writer and producer, co-wrote the animated feature Shrek
Stuart Seide (B.A. 1967), artistic director of the Théâtre du Nord in Lille, France, and the first American to direct the Comédie-Française
Jimmy Smits (B.A. 1980), actor, NYPD Blue and L.A. Law; won Emmy Award in 1990
Frank Tarloff (B.A. 1936), blacklisted American screenwriter who won an Academy Award for Best Original Screenplay for Father Goose
Elliot Tiber (attended, but did not graduate), screenwriter, "saved" Woodstock Festival
Adrianne Tolsch (B.A. 1961), comedian long associated with Catch a Rising Star
Frank P. Tomasulo, PhD (B.A. 1967), award-winning film and media professor, noted journal editor and critic
Tom Topor (B.A. 1961), playwright, screenwriter, and novelist
Adam Wade (M.A. '87), singer, drummer, and television actor, noted for his stint as the host of the 1975 CBS game show Musical Chairs, which made him the first African-American game show host
Naren Weiss (M.F.A. 2015), actor, playwright, and model
Andrew D. Weyman (B.A. 1973), television director and producer
Fawn Yacker (B.A. 1973), founding member of The Nuclear Beauty Parlor, filmmaker, producer and cinematographer, known for her 2009 documentary Training Rules
Joel Zwick (B.A. 1962), theater and television producer, Family Matters, director of My Big Fat Greek Wedding (2002)

Music

Mark Barkan (B.A. 1956), songwriter and record producer and the musical director for the television show The Banana Splits Adventure Hour
Benjamin Bierman (M.M. 2002), jazz trumpeter, composer, and bandleader
Susan Birkenhead (B.A. 1957), lyricist
Benjamin Boretz (B.A. 1954), 20th- and 21st-century composer and music theorist
Oscar Brand (B.S. 1942), folk singer, radio host, musicologist
Isidore Cohen (B.A 1941), chamber musician, violinist, and member of the Juilliard String Quartet and Beaux Arts Trio
Alex Coletti (B.A. 1987), executive producer and director for MTV Networks, now an independent producer
Eddie Daniels (B.A. 1963), jazz clarinet and alto and tenor saxophone player; also a classical music clarinetist
Deborah Drattell (B.A. 1976), composer, best known for opera
Rebekah Driscoll (M.M. 2012), composer
Sylvia Fine (B.A. 1933), lyricist; wife of comedian Danny Kaye
Gary William Friedman (B.A. 1958), musician and composer of musical theater
David Geffen, business magnate, co-created Asylum Records, Geffen Records, DGC Records, and DreamWorks SKG
Daniel Glass (B.A. 1977), music industry producer
Henry Gross (B.A. 1972), singer-songwriter and founding member of the retro pop group Sha Na Na
Larry Harlow (musician) aka Lawrence Ira Khan (B.A. 1963), salsa composer, pianist, and musician
Fred Hellerman (B.A. 1949), folk singer, guitarist, producer and songwriter, primarily known as one of the members of The Weavers
Cihan Kaan (B.S. 1999), musician; filmmaker; author; recorded electronic music under the alias "8Bit"
Kim Ji-hyun, South Korean singer
Harvey Lichtenstein (B.A. 1951), President and Executive Producer of the Brooklyn Academy of Music
Bob Margolis (B.A. 1974, M.M. 1977), composer of concert music and owner of Manhattan Beach Music Publishers  
Gladys Smuckler Moskowitz (B.A. 1949), folk singer (as Gladys Young), composer and teacher
Jerry Moss (B.A., 1957), co-founder of A & M Records
Enisa Nikaj (B.B.A. 2017), also known as Enisa, Montenegrin-American singer songwriter
Sonny Ochs (B.A. 1970), music producer, radio host, sister of singer-songwriter Phil Ochs
Arturo O'Farrill (BMus 1996), jazz musician and current pianist, composer, and director for the Afro Latin Jazz Orchestra
Lee Pockriss (B.A. 1948), songwriter who wrote many well-known popular songs, including "Itsy Bitsy Teenie Weenie Yellow Polka Dot Bikini"
Doc Pomus (attended, 1943–45), blues singer, songwriter and member of the Rock and Roll Hall of Fame
Rafael Scarfullery (B.M. 1993), Dominican classical guitarist
Harrison Sheckler (M.M. 2021), pianist and composer
Maynard Solomon (B.A. 1950), co-founder of Vanguard Records, music producer, and musicologist
David Sardy music producer, film composer
Jason Stanyek (B.M. 1990), ethnomusicologist, composer, and guitarist; professor at the University of Oxford
Dirk Weiler (M.M. 2002), singer and actor
Walter Yetnikoff (B.A. 1955), CEO of CBS Records, Columbia Records/Sony Music executive

Government, law, and public policy

General

Cy A Adler (B.A. 1950), president of Shorewalkers, Inc.; author, organizer, and conservationist, advocate for shoreline issues in and around New York City
Dionisia Amaya (Adv. Cert. 1987), teacher and Honduran Garifuna community activist
Bill Baird (B.A. 1955), reproductive rights activist and co-director of the Pro Choice League
Barbara P. Berman (B.A. 1959), Democratic Party politician who served in the New Jersey General Assembly for a single term, where she represented the 6th Legislative District from 1978 to 1980
Dorothy Blum (B.A. 1944), computer scientist, cryptanalyst, and National Security Agency officer
Barbara Boxer (née Barbara Levy; B.A. 1962), United States Representative and United States Senator (D – California)
Frank J. Brasco (B.A. 1955), member of the United States House of Representatives 1967–75
Marshall Brement (B.A. 1951), career United States Foreign Service officer; United States Ambassador to Iceland 1981–1985
Erin Byrnes (M.S. 2010), member of the Michigan House of Representatives for the 15th district since 2023
Shirley Chisholm (B.A. 1946), first African-American U.S. Congresswoman, 1968–82
Gwyndolen Clarke-Reed (B.S. 1973), educator and representative for District 92 of the Florida House of Representatives
Manuel F. Cohen (B.S. 1933), chairman, Securities and Exchange Commission, 1964–69
William Colton (MSed 1971), represents District 47 in the New York Assembly
Victoria Cruz (B.A. 1982), LGBT rights activist and retired domestic violence counselor
Donald J. Devine (M.A. 1965), political scientist; author; former director of the United States Office of Personnel Management
Barbaralee Diamonstein-Spielvogel (B.A. 1952), author, preservationist, curator, and chairwoman of the New York State Council on the Arts
Martin Malave Dilan (B.A. 1984), represented District 17 in the New York State Senate 2009-19
Stanley Fink (B.A. 1956), member of the New York State Assembly 1969–1986; Speaker 1979–1986
Leonard Garment (B.A. 1946), White House Counsel
Phillip Goldfeder (B.A. '04), Democratic New York State Assembly member from the borough of Queens, 2011–2016.
Victor Gotbaum (B.A. 1948), labor leader
Ari Harow (B.A. 2000), former Chief of Staff of Israeli Prime Minister Benjamin Netanyahu
Syed Fahad Hashmi (B.A. 2003), convicted terrorist
Dov Hikind (M.A. 1981), New York State Assemblyman representing Brooklyn's Assembly District 48
Herbert E. Horowitz (B.A. 1952), American Ambassador to Gabon (1986–1989)
Rhoda Jacobs (B.A. 1962), represents District 42 in Brooklyn in the New York State Assembly, where she serves as Assistant Speaker
Ellen Jaffee (B.A. 1965), represents District 55 in the New York State Assembly
Kimberly Jean-Pierre (B.F.A. 2006), represents the 11th Assembly District in the New York State Assembly
Meir Kahane (B.A. 1954), Israeli-American Orthodox rabbi, writer, and ultra-nationalist politician who co-founded the Jewish Defense League and served one term in Israel's Knesset
Roberta Kalechofsky (B.A. 1952), writer, feminist, and animal rights activist; founder of Jews for Animal Rights
Vera Katz (B.A. 1955), mayor of Portland, Oregon, 1993–2005
Ivan Lafayette (B.A. 1951), member of the New York State Assembly since 1977 and Deputy Speaker of the New York State Assembly since 2006
Sy Landy (B.A. 1952), Trotskyist politician, co-founder of the League for the Revolutionary Party
Howard L. Lasher (B.A. 1965), New York State Assemblyman and New York City Councilman; first Orthodox Jew elected to state office in New York
Burton Levin (B.A. 1952), US Ambassador to Burma
Mark Lowenthal (B.A. 1969), CIA's Assistant Director of Central Intelligence for Analysis and Production 2002–2005, where he was a key coordinator and valuator of the National Intelligence Estimate on Iraq leading up to Operation Iraqi Freedom
Alan Maisel (Adv. Cert. 1990), New York State Assemblyman representing District 59
Marty Markowitz (B.A. 1970), New York State Senator; Brooklyn Borough President (2001–2013)
George Martinez (B.A 1998), educator, activist, artist, and hip-hop political pioneer
Mel Miller (B.A. 1961), member of the New York State Assembly 1971–1991; Speaker 1987–1991
Joan Millman (B.A. 1962), New York State Assemblywoman representing District 52
Elvin Nimrod, Grenada Minister for Legal Affairs and Minister of Foreign Affairs
Manfred Ohrenstein (B.A. 1948), New York State Senate Minority Leader
Joseph Pennacchio (B.S. 1976), represents the 26th Legislative district in the New Jersey Senate
N. Nick Perry (B.A. 1978), New York State Assemblyman, District 58 (1993-2022); United States Ambassador to Jamaica since 2022
Mary Pinkett (B.A. 1974), first African-American New York City Councilwoman, serving the 28th and 35th districts from 1974 to 2001
Harvey Pitt (B.A. 1965), Chairman of the Securities and Exchange Commission
Robert Rosenthal (B.A. 1938), highly decorated World War II pilot and assistant to the U.S. prosecutor at the Nuremberg Trials
Gene Russianoff (B.A. 1974), staff attorney and chief spokesman for the Straphangers Campaign, New York City-based public transport advocacy group
Edward Sagarin (B.A. 1961), sociologist, pseudonymously wrote The Homosexual in America: A Subjective Approach (1951), considered one of the most influential works in the history of the gay rights movement
John L. Sampson (B.A. 1987), represents District 19 in the New York State Senate where he serves in a leadership position as chairman of the Democratic Conference.
Bernie Sanders (attended 1959–1960), United States Senator for Vermont
James Sanders, Jr. (B.A. 1984), represents the 10th Senatorial District in the New York State Senate
Bernice Sandler (B.A. 1948), the 'Godmother of Title IX'
Sam Schwartz, aka "Gridlock Sam" (B.S. 1969), transportation engineer, believed responsible for popularizing the word gridlock
Murray Seeman (B.A. 1934), lawyer, real estate developer, and community leader
Frank Serpico (A.A. 1959), New York City Police Department (NYPD) officer famous for testifying against police corruption
Al Sharpton (1975), civil rights activist 
Norman Siegel (B.A. 1965), director of the New York Civil Liberties Union (NYCLU), 1985–2000
Susan Silbey (B.A. 1962), sociologist at the Massachusetts Institute of Technology, best known for her work on popular legal consciousness 
David Sive (B.A. 1943), attorney, environmentalist, and professor of environmental law, who has been recognized as a pioneer in the field of United States environmental law
Eleanor Sobel (B.A. 1967), State Representative in the Florida House of Representatives, 1998–2006
Pamela Talkin (B.S. 1968, M.A. 1971), Marshal of the Supreme Court of the United States and the first woman to hold this position
William L. Taylor (B.A. 1952), attorney and civil rights advocate
Seymour R. Thaler (B.A. 1940), member of the New York State Senate 1959–1971
Mark Treyger (B.A. 2005, M.A. 2009, M.S.Ed 2012), member of the New York City Council, representing District 47
Beatrice N. Vaccara (B.A. 1943), economist and economic statistician; head of the Bureau of Industrial Economics at the United States Department of Commerce
Eliezer Waldman (B.A. 1959), Israeli rabbi and former politician who served as a member of the Knesset for Tehiya between 1984 and 1990
Benjamin Ward (B.A. 1960), first African American New York City Police Commissioner, 1983–89
John Earl Warren Jr. (Attended 1965–66), United States Army officer and a recipient of the Medal of Honor for his actions in the Vietnam War.
Iris Weinshall (B.A. 1975), vice chancellor at the City University of New York and Commissioner of the New York City Department of Transportation
Moses M. Weinstein (B.A. 1934), lawyer and politician
Warren Weinstein (B.A. 1963), contractor; director in Pakistan for J.E. Austin Associates kidnapped by al-Qaeda in August 2011 and killed in January 2015 by a US-led drone strike on the Afghanistan-Pakistan border
Saul Weprin (B.A. 1948), member of the New York State Assembly 1973–1994; Speaker 1991–1994
Jumaane Williams (B.A. 2001, M.A. 2005), Democratic politician, member of the New York City Council
Lynne Williams (M.A. 1975), Maine politician and former chairperson of the Maine Green Independent Party
Maxine Wolfe (B.A. 1961), activist for AIDS, civil rights, lesbian rights, and reproductive rights
Stanley Yolles (B.A. 1939), psychiatrist head of the National Institute of Mental Health from 1964 to 1970

Judges

 Noach Dear (B.S. 1975), New York Supreme Court judge
Patricia DiMango (B.A. 1973), television personality and former justice of the Supreme court of Kings County, New York
David Friedman (B.A. 1971), Associate Justice of the New York Appellate Division of the Supreme Court, First Judicial Department
Arthur Gonzalez (M.S. 1976), United States Bankruptcy Court Judge for the Southern District of New York, presided over the bankruptcy proceedings for WorldCom, Enron, and Chrysler
Sterling Johnson, Jr. (B.A. 1963), senior United States district judge for the Eastern District of New York
Edward R. Korman (B.A. 1963), Senior Judge, United States District Court for the Eastern District of New York
Doris Ling-Cohan (B.A. 1976), judge on the New York State Supreme Court
Rosemary S. Pooler (B.A. 1959), Judge, U.S. Court of Appeals for the Second Circuit
Deborah Poritz (B.A. 1958), first female Chief Justice, New Jersey State Supreme Court; first female New Jersey Attorney General, 1994–96
Jason K. Pulliam (B.A. 1995; M.A. 1997), United States federal judge for the United States District Court for the Western District of Texas
Joel Harvey Slomsky (B.A. 1967), United States federal judge for the United States District Court for the Eastern District of Pennsylvania
William C. Thompson (B.A. 1949), Brooklyn's first African American State Senator; Justice of the New York Supreme Court, Appellate Division
Jack B. Weinstein (B.A. 1943), Columbia Law School professor and Senior Judge, United States District Court for the Eastern District of New York

Attorneys
Benjamin Brafman (B.A. 1971), prominent criminal defense attorney
George Carroll (B.A. 1943), lawyer who was important civic figure in Contra Costa County, California and the city of Richmond
Jay Goldberg (B.A. 1954), trial attorney, formerly a member of the Justice Department in the Kennedy administration
Robert M. Kaufman (B.A. 1951), attorney, partner with the law firm Proskauer Rose, and former president of the New York City Bar Association
Harvey R. Miller (B.A. 1954), bankruptcy lawyer with Weil, Gotshal & Manges
Jay Neveloff (B.A.1971), real estate lawyer with the law firm Kramer Levin Naftalis & Frankel known for representing Donald Trump and his companies.
Emanuel Quint (B.A. 1949), rabbi, lawyer, and co-founder of Touro College

Journalism

Madeline Amgott (B.A. 1942), television news television producer
Charlotte Brooks (B.A. 1940), photographer and photojournalist
Stu Bykofsky (B.A. 1965), journalist and columnist for the Philadelphia Daily News
Thom Calandra (B.A. 1979), founding editor and chief columnist for CBS MarketWatch.com
John Cigna (A.A. 1956), radio personality at KDKA-AM in Pittsburgh, 1973–2001
Stan Fischler (B.A 1954), journalist, historian, hockey broadcaster, five-time Emmy award winner, and member of the Hockey Hall of Fame
Sylvan Fox (B.A. 1951), journalist and Pulitzer Prize winner
Marc Frons (B.A. 1977), Chief Technology Officer of The New York Times
Dele Giwa (B.A. 1977), Nigerian journalist, editor and founder of Newswatch magazine; killed by mail bomb in his home
Robert Greenfield (B.A. 1967), author, journalist and screenwriter
Dorie Greenspan (B.A. 1969), American author of cookbooks, New York Times columnist, James Beard Foundation Award award winner.
Yossi Klein Halevi (B.A. 1975), Israeli journalist; columnist for The New Republic
Charles Lachman (B.A. 1974), Executive Producer of the news magazine program Inside Edition
Victor Lasky (B.A 1940), Pulitzer Prize-winning writer and syndicated newspaper columnist
Victoria Law (B.A. 2002), anarchist activist, and writer; co-founder of Books Through Bars
Don Lemon (B.A. 1996), news anchor, CNN
Marvin E. Newman (B.A. 1949), artist and photographer
Stanley Newman (B.S. 1973), puzzle creator, editor, and publisher
Stanley Penn, journalist, won a Pulitzer Prize for National Affairs Reporting
Ekerete Udoh (M.A. 2006), Nigerian politician, former columnist in ThisDay Newspaper, and Chief Press Secretary to Udom Gabriel Emmanuel, the Ibom State Governor
Abraham Rabinovich (B.A. 1956), Israeli historian and journalist
Milt Rosenberg (B.A. 1946), host of Extension 720 on WGN Radio in Chicago, Illinois.
Harold Schonberg (B.A. 1937), Pulitzer Prize-winning music critic and journalist, most notably for The New York Times
Allan Sloan (B.A. 1966), financial journalist; Senior Editor-at-Large for Fortune Magazine
Dorothy Sucher [B.A. 1954], her reporting for a Maryland newspaper led to landmark Supreme Court case, Greenbelt Cooperative Publishing Assn., Inc. v. Bresler, which the paper won; author
Barry Sussman (B.A. 1956), editor, author, and public opinion analyst; city news editor at  The Washington Post at the time of the Watergate break-in
Maia Szalavitz (B.A. 1991), reporter, author of Help at Any Cost: How the Troubled-Teen Industry Cons Parents and Hurts Kids
Glenn Thrush (B.A. 1990), journalist, pundit, and author. He has been the White House correspondent for The New York Times since 2017
Gina Trapani (M.S 1998), tech blogger, web developer, writer, and founder of the Lifehacker blog
Ann Marie Adams (B.A. 1999), journalist, pundit, author, and historian. She has been the White House Correspondent for The Hartford Guardian since 2013. She is also founder of the first nonprofit hyperlocal news publication in New England and the tri-state area. She was also the first Black editor of the Excelsior and the first Black Editor-in-Chief of The Kingsman.

Literature and the arts

Kwesi Abbensetts (B.A. 2012), Guyanese photographer based in New York City
Cecile Abish (B.A. 1953), artist known for sculpture and photography
Sam Abrams (B.A. 1958), "The Old Pothead Poet", Rochester Institute of Technology professor, Whitman scholar
Jack Adler (B.A. 1942), award-winning cover artist and colorist for DC Comics
Jack Agüeros (B.A. 1964), Puerto Rican community activist, poet, writer, translator, and director of the Museo del Barrio in New York City
Saladin Ahmed (M.F.A. 2002), Arab-American science fiction and fantasy writer and poet
Mario Amaya (B.A. 1954), art critic; shot by Valerie Solanas during her assassination attempt on Andy Warhol
Suzanne Anker (B.A. 1967), visual artist, theorist and pioneer in Bio Art
Rilla Askew (M.F.A 1989), Oklahoma-based short story writer and novelist
Helène Aylon (B.A. 1960), multimedia ecofeminist artist
Annie Baker (M.F.A. 2009), Pulitzer Prize-winning playwright
Huáscar Barradas (B.M. 1987), Venezuelan flautist and Professor of flute at the Instituto Universitario de Estudios Musicales in Caracas
Jennifer Bartlett (M.A. 2004), poet, editor, and disability activist
Gina Beavers (M.SEd, 2005), Greek-American painter, whose subject include food, makeup, and viral images, often in bas-relief
Paul Beatty (M.F.A. 1989), African American poet, novelist, and critic
Betty T. Bennett (B.A. 1962), scholar on the life of Frankenstein author Mary Wollstonecraft Shelley, Distinguished Professor of Literature and Dean of the College of Arts and Sciences at American University
Eddie Berganza (B.A. 1986), Group Editor for DC Comics
Karen Berger (B.A. 1979), editor of DC Comics' Vertigo imprint
Anselm Berrigan (M.F.A. 1998), poet and teacher and artistic director of the St. Mark's Poetry Project from 2003 to 2007
Florence Bonime (B.A. 1975), American novelist; published under the name Florence Cummings
Michael Bradford (M.F.A. 2000), playwright and former artistic director of the Connecticut Repertory Theatre
Himan Brown (B.A. 1934), radio pioneer; producer of radio programming, including the Inner Sanctum Mysteries and the CBS Radio Mystery Theater
Anatole Broyard (attended 1937–41, did not graduate), writer, literary critic and editor for The New York Times
Madelyn Byrne (M.M. 1993), noted composer of both acoustic and computer music
Emil Cadoo (B.A. 1952), American photographer
Sylvia Cassedy (B.A. 1951), children's and young adult fiction author, best known for her 1983 novel Behind the Attic Wall
Allen Cohen (B.A. 1962), poet, founder and editor of the San Francisco Oracle underground newspaper (1966–68) 
Garrard Conley (M.F.A. 2020), American author and LGBTQ activist known for his autobiography Boy Erased: A Memoir
Michael Corris (B.A. 1970), artist, art historian, and writer on art
Patricia Cronin (M.F.A. 1988), Rome Prize-winning feminist visual artist
Amanda Davis (M.F.A. 1998), writer; author of "Wonder When You'll Miss Me"
J. M. DeMatteis (B.A. 1976), writer of comic books
Max Desfor, Pulitzer Prize winning photographer
Thomas Devaney (MFA 1998), poet and 2014 Pew Fellow in the Arts
Dan DiDio (B.A. 1983), comic book editor and executive for DC Comics
Sante D'Orazio (B.A. 1978), fashion photographer
Natalie Edgar(B.A. 1953), abstract expressionist painter, former critic for ARTnews
Hillard Elkins (B.A. 1950), theatre and film producer
Stanley Ellin (B.A. 1936), Edgar Award-winning mystery author
Yevgeniy Fiks (B.F.A. 1997), multidisciplinary, Post-Soviet conceptual artist
Jane Freilicher (B.A. 1947), representational painter and member of the informal New York School
Robert Friend (B.A. 1934), Israeli poet and translator
Alice Friman (B.A. 1954), poet; Poet-in-Residence at Georgia College
Gregory William Frux (M.F.A. 1985), traditional realist artist, working mainly in the landscape genre
Elizabeth Gaffney (M.F.A. 1997), novelist and staff editor of The Paris Review, 1989–2005
Elliott Galkin (B.A. 1943), music critic of The Baltimore Sun, director of the Peabody Institute, and sometime conductor of the Baltimore Symphony Orchestra
Mike Garson (B.A. 1970), pianist; has worked with David Bowie, Nine Inch Nails, Billy Corgan, Free Flight, and The Smashing Pumpkins
Ja'Tovia Gary (B.A. 2012), American artist and filmmaker whose works explore black feminist themes
Joe Glazer (B.A. 1938), folk musician often referred to as "labor's troubadour"
Eunice Golden (M.F.A. 1980), American feminist painter 
David Gordon (B.F.A. 1956), dancer, choreographer, theatre director, writer
Shirley Gorelick (B.A. 1944), painter of psychological realism
Richard Grayson (B.A. 1973, M.F.A. 1976), writer, political activist and performance artist
Irving Greenfield (B.A. 1950), prolific author of more than 300 novels
Roya Hakakian (B.S. 1990), Jewish Iranian-American writer
John Harlacher (B.A. 2000), actor, stage director, and filmmaker responsible for the horror film Urchin (2007)
Irving Harper (B.A. 1937), noted 20th-century industrial designer
Marvin Heiferman (B.A. 1968), influential American photography curator and writer
Michelle Herman (B.A. 1976), writer and Professor of English at Ohio State University, and director of the M.F.A. Program in Creative Writing
Lee Israel (B,A, 1961), noted author who became a literary forger and thief; subject of 2018 film Can You Ever Forgive Me?
Angela Jansen (B.A. 1951) American painter, sculptor, print-maker and photographer
Chester Kallman (B.A. 1941), poet, librettist, and translator; collaborator with W. H. Auden
Howard Kaminsky (B.A. 1961), publisher, author and film producer
Karen Karnes (B.A. 1946), ceramist, known for her earth-toned stoneware ceramics
Ben Katchor (B.A. 1975), cartoonist, creator of Julius Knipl, Real Estate Photographer
Ada Katz (B.S. 1950), wife and model of Alex Katz
Sibyl Kempson (M.F.A. 2007), playwright and performer
Daniel Keyes (B.A. 1950. M.A. '61), author known for his Hugo award-winning short story and Nebula award-winning novel Flowers for Algernon
Amirtha Kidambi (M.M. 2012), Jazz musician (vocal, harmonium, composition)
Binnie Kirshenbaum (M.F.A. 1984), novelist, short story writer, Columbia University creative writing professor
Sibyl Kempson (M.F.A. 2007), playwright and performer
Frances Koncan (M.F.A. 2013) Anishinaabe-Slovene journalist, theater director, and playwright from Couchiching First Nation who lives in Winnipeg, Manitoba 
 Frances Kornbluth (B.A. 1940), abstract expressionist painter
Marni Kotak (M.F.A. 2006), artist known for her durational performance/exhibition "The Birth of Baby X," in which she gave birth to her son
Margia Kramer (B.A. 1961), documentary visual artist, writer and activist
Albert Kresch (B.A. 1943), New York School painter and one of the original members of the Jane Street Gallery
Bernard Krigstein (B.A. 1940), illustrator and gallery artist who received acclaim for his innovative and influential approach to comic book art, notably in EC Comics
Mort Künstler (B.A. 1946), painter and illustrator of the American Civil War
Ezra Laderman (B.A. 1950), composer of classical music
Gabriel Laderman (B.A. 1952), painter and important exponent of the Figurative revival
Abshalom Jac Lahav (M.F.A. 2008) Israeli-born, New York City–based artist known for his portraits of historical figures in modern contexts
Young Jean Lee (M.F.A. 2005), OBIE Award-winning playwright and director of experimental theater, artistic director of Young Jean Lee's Theater Company
Alan Lelchuk (B.A. 1960), novelist
Sam Levenson (B.A. 1934), humorist, author
Fred Lonberg-Holm (B.M. 1988), cello player and composer
Leonard Lopate (B.A. 1967), host of the public radio talk show The Leonard Lopate Show, broadcast on WNYC
Robert Lyons (M.F.A. 2010), writer, playwright and director, best known as the artistic director the two-time OBIE Award-winning New Ohio Theatre in New York City
Jackson Mac Low (B.A. 1958), poet, performance artist, composer and playwright
Rajendra Ramoon Maharaj (M.F.A. 2011), Indo-Afro-Caribbean American theater director, playwright, producer and activist.
John Mahon (B.A. 1952), historian, author of New York's Fighting 69th
Wallace Markfield (B.A. 1947), comic novelist, film critic
Paule Marshall (B.A. 1953), author, novelist (Brown Girl, Brownstones (1959), Praisesong for the Widow (1983))
Cris Mazza (M.F.A. 1983), novelist, short story and non-fiction writer
James McCandlish (B.A. 1956), German translator
Frank McCourt (M.A. 1967), Pulitzer Prize-winning author of Angela's Ashes and 'Tis
Dennis McFarland (B.A. 1975), novelist; The Music Room (1990)
Michael McKenzie (B.A. 1973), artist, publisher, curator, and writer
Murray Mednick (B.A. 1962), playwright
Sharon Mesmer (M.F.A. 1990), writer and poet of the Flarf poetry movement
Annette Michelson (B.A. 1948), art and film critic and writer whose work contributed to the fields of cinema studies and the avant-garde in visual culture.
Richard P. Minsky (B.A. 1968), scholar of bookbinding and a book artist
Emily Mitchell (M.F.A. 2005), Anglo-American novelist
Gloria Naylor (B.A. 1981), novelist; Winner National Book Award
Peter Nero (born Bernard Nierow; B.A. 1956), Grammy Award-winning pianist; conductor; composer
Harold Norse (B.A. 1938), poet and novelist
Marco Oppedisano (B.M. 1996), guitarist and composer of electroacoustic music
Maia Cruz Palileo (M.F.A. 2008), artist
Victor Perera (B.A. 1956), Guatemalan-born author and journalist primarily concerned with Latin America and Sephardic Jewry
Angelo Parra (M.F.A. 1995), playwright
Benjamin Jason Parris (B.S. 1984), educator, museum planner, and author of fantasy series Wade of Aquitaine
Lincoln Peirce (M.F.A. 1987), cartoonist of the comic strip Big Nate
Jed Perl (M.F.A. 1974), art critic, formerly with The New Republic from 1994 to 2014
Robert Phillips (M.A. 1982), Classical guitarist, composer, educator, and Head of Performing Arts at All Saints' Academy
Rosalie Purvis (M.F.A. 2007), Dutch American theatre director and choreographer
Anna Rabinowitz (B.A. 1953), poet, librettist, editor and editor emerita of American Letters & Commentary
Burton Raffel (B.A. 1948), teacher, poet and translator of Beowulf, Horace, Rabelais and Cervantes
Naomi Ragen (B.A. 1971), American-Israeli author, playwright and women's rights activist
Elaine Reichek (B.A. 1963), New York-based visual artist, whose work often concerns the history of the embroidered sampler.
Naomi Rosenblum (B.A. 1948), historian of photography, author of A World History of Photography (1984) and A History of Women Photographers (1994)
Martha Rosler (B.A. 1965), artist active in video, photo-text, installation, and performance
Norman Rosten (B.A. 1935), poet, playwright, novelist, Poet Laureate of Brooklyn (1979–1995)
Matthue Roth (M.F.A. 2014), columnist, author, poet, spoken word performer, video game designer, and screenwriter.
Theodore Isaac Rubin (B.A. 1946), psychiatrist and author; wrote story for the film David and Lisa (1962)
Howard Sackler (B.A. 1950), Pulitzer Prize-winning screenwriter and playwright, known for 1967 play The Great White Hope
Ellen R. Sandor (B.A. 1963), new media artist and photography collector; proponent of PHSColograms, art that combines photography, holography, sculpture, and computer graphics
Kristina "Tina" Satter (M.F.A. 2008), playwright and director
Sapphire (M.F.A. 1995), author and performance poet, author of the novel Push (1996)
Millicent Selsam (B.A. 1932), children's author
Irwin Shaw (born Irwin Shamforoff; B.A. 1934), playwright, screenwriter, and short-story author and novelist (The Young Lions, Rich Man, Poor Man); winner of two O. Henry Awards
Sara Shepard (M.F.A. 2005), author known for the bestselling Pretty Little Liars and The Lying Game book series; both were developed into television series on ABC Family
Shraga Silverstein (B.A. 1940, M.A. 1954) Rabbi, educator and prolific author and translator
Walter Skolnik (B.A. 1955), composer and musical educator
Jan Slepian (B.A. 1971), author of books for children and young adult fiction
Robert Kimmel Smith (B.A. 1951), children's author, known for Chocolate Fever (1972) and Jane's House (1982)
Sasson Soffer (B.A. 1954), abstract painter and sculptor
Gilbert Sorrentino (B.A. 1957), novelist, short story writer, poet, literary critic, and editor
Laurie Spiegel (B.A. 1975), electronic-music composer, inventor
Ed Spielman (A.A. 1965), writer and producer, one of the creators of the TV series Kung Fu;  also creator of the TV series The Young Riders and   Dead Man's Gun
Jason Starr (M.F.A. 1990), Anthony Award- and Barry Award-winning author of crime fiction novels and thrillers
Claire Sterling (B.A. 1940), author and journalist, author of The Terror Network (1981)
Ronald Tavel (B.A. 1957), screenwriter, director, novelist, poet and actor, known for his work with Andy Warhol and The Factory
David Trinidad (M.F.A. 1990), poet
Alan Vega (B.A. 1960), vocalist for 1970s and 80s electronic protopunk duo Suicide
Jericho Vincent (B.A. 2007), author and memoirist; Cut Me Loose: Sin and Salvation After My Ultra-Orthodox Girlhood (2014)
Chiqui Vicioso (B.A. 1979), poet, writer, sociologist and Dominican diplomat
Malvin Wald (B.A. 1936), screenwriter, authored the 1948 police drama The Naked City
Nari Ward (M.F.A. 1992), Jamaican-born artist based in New York City whose work is often composed of found objects from his neighborhood, and "address issues related to consumer culture, poverty, and race"
Marion Winik (M.F.A. 1983), journalist and author, best known for her work on NPR's All Things Considered
Richard Winston (B.A. 1939) and Clara Brussel Winston (B.A. 1939), translators of Thomas Mann, Franz Kafka, Hannah Arendt, Albert Speer, Hermann Hesse, and Rolf Hochhuth.
Leah Nanako Winkler (M.F.A. 2018), Japanese American playwright whose play God Said This won the 2018 Yale Drama Series Prize.
Adrianne Wortzel (B.A. 1964), contemporary artist who uses robotics
Jeffrey Cyphers Wright (M.F.A 1987), New Romantic poet associated with St. Mark's Poetry Project
John Yau (M.F.A. 1978), critic, essayist, poet, and prose writer
Rafi Zabor (B.A. 1967), music journalist- and musician-turned-novelist
Malcah Zeldis (B.A. 1972), twentieth century Jewish American folk painter
Feenie Ziner (B.A. 1941), American children's literature writer and professor at the University of Connecticut
Harriet Zinnes (M.A. 1944), American poet, fiction writer, translator, art critic, literary scholar and professor

Religion
J. David Bleich (B.A. 1960), authority on Jewish law and ethics, including Jewish medical ethics
Bhikkhu Bodhi (B.A. 1966), American Buddhist monk, second president of the Buddhist Publication Society, 1984–2002
Reeve Brenner (B.A. 1958), Reform rabbi, inventor and author
Mariano Di Gangi (B.A. 1943), prominent minister of the Presbyterian Church in Canada (PCC)
Theodore Drange (B.A. 1955), philosopher of religion and Professor Emeritus at West Virginia University, noted for his Argument from nonbelief
Sylvia Ettenberg (B.A 1938), Jewish educator and one of the founders of the Camp Ramah camping movement
Susie Fishbein (B.A. 1986), Orthodox Jewish kosher cookbook author, and cooking teacher
Satsvarupa dasa Goswami (B.A. 1961), senior disciple and biographer of A. C. Bhaktivedanta Swami Prabhupada, founder of the International Society for Krishna Consciousness (ISKCON)
Blu Greenberg (B.A. 1957), co-founder and first president of the Jewish Orthodox Feminist Alliance; active in the movement to bridge Judaism and feminism
Jonathan Greenstein, antique Judaica authentication expert
David Weiss Halivni (B.A. 1953), American-Israeli rabbi, scholar in the domain of Jewish Sciences and professor of Talmud
Norma Joseph (B.A. 1966), Canadian professor, Orthodox Jewish feminist, and activist
Adina Miles (B.A. 2009, MS 2012), better known as FlatbushGirl, comedian, activist and political candidate, who has attracted attention for her challenges to Orthodox Jewish standards for women
Rabbi Yaakov Perlow (B.A. 1955), Hasidic rebbe and rosh yeshiva, current Novominsker Rebbe
Shais Rishon (B.A. 2005), pen name MaNishtana, an African-American Orthodox rabbi, activist, and writer
Larry Rosenberg (B.A. 1954), American Buddhist teacher and proponent of anapanasati (mindful breath meditation)
Henry Rosenblum (B.A. 1969), hazzan (cantor) of the Forest Hills Jewish Center in Queens, NY and Dean of the H.L. Miller Cantorial School of the Jewish Theological Seminary of America 1998–2010
Jacob J. Schacter (B.A. 1973), University Professor of Jewish History and Jewish Thought and Senior Scholar at the Center for the Jewish Future at Yeshiva University
Pinchas Stolper (B.A. 1952), Orthodox rabbi, writer, and spokesman
Herbert Tarr (B.A. 1949), Reform rabbi who left his pulpit to become a novelist and humorist
Eliezer Waldman(B.A. 1959), Israeli Orthodox rabbi and former politician, who served as a member of the Knesset for Tehiya between 1984 and 1990
Tzvi Hersh Weinreb (B.A. 1962), Executive Vice President Emeritus of the Orthodox Union
Isaiah Zeldin (B.A. 1941) rabbi
Chaim Dovid Zwiebel (B.A. 1975), Executive Vice President of Agudath Israel of America

Science and technology

Biochemistry and chemistry

Samuel Ajl (B.A. 1945), microbiologist and biochemist; expert in microbial toxins
Stanley Cohen (B.A. 1943), biochemist and Nobel laureate (Physiology or Medicine, 1986)
Martha Greenblatt (B.S. 1962), chemist at Rutgers University, received the 2003 American Chemical Society's Garvan-Olin Medal
Arthur R. Grossman (1973), biologist whose research ranges across plant biology, microbiology, marine biology, phytochemistry, and photosynthesis.
Jerry March (M.S. 1953), chemist and author of March's Advanced Organic Chemistry
Alexander H. Popkin (B.S. 1934), scientist and prolific inventor, developed synthetic lubricant for car and truck engines and Esso Extra Gasoline, containing a detergent additive advertisers claimed "Put a Tiger in Your Tank" 
Barnett Rosenberg (B.S. 1948), chemist, known for his discovery of the anti-cancer drug cisplatin
Howard Sachs (B.S. 1949), biochemist; pioneer the study of neuroendocrinology
Nicholas Sand (B.A. 1966), clandestine chemist and early proponent of psychedelics
Seymour Shapiro (B.S. 1935), organic chemist, known for his pioneering work on a class of drugs used to treat symptoms of adult-onset diabetes
Karen Joy Shaw (B.S. 1976), American microbiologist and discoverer of novel antifungal and antibacterial compounds
Harry Wiener (B.S. 1945) chemist, physician and psychologist, and pioneer in cheminformatics and chemical graph theory

Computer science
Martin Goetz (B.A. 1953), pioneer in the development of the commercial software industry; holds the first U.S. software patent
Lawrence Landweber (B.S. 1963), Internet pioneer, helped develop CSNET, founding member and president of the Internet Society
Jack Minker (B.S. 1949), authority in artificial intelligence, deductive databases, logic programming and non-monotonic reasoning
George Radin (B.A. 1951) computer scientist, helped develop the PL/I programming language and design the OS/360 and TSS/360 systems
Gerard Salton (B.S. 1950), pioneering computer scientist in the field of information retrieval
Joan Targ (B.A. 1960), pioneer in computer education and older sister of chess champion Bobby Fischer

Mathematics
Milton Abramowitz (B.A. 1940, M.S. 1942), mathematician, co-author of the Handbook of Mathematical Functions with Formulas, Graphs, and Mathematical Tables (1964)
Ruth Aaronson Bari (B.A. 1939), mathematician known for her work in graph theory and homomorphisms
Richard Bellman (B.A. 1941), applied mathematician and inventor of dynamic programming
Sol Garfunkel (B.A. 1963), mathematician and long-time executive director of the Consortium for Mathematics and Its Applications
Edna Grossman (B.S. 1968), mathematician
Frank Harary (B.A. 1941, M.A. 1945), mathematician, specializing in graph theory
William Kantor (B.S. 1964), mathematician, specializing in group theory and geometry.
Julian Keilson (B.S. 1947), mathematician, known for his work in probability theory
Seymour Lipschutz (B.A. 1952, M.A. 1956), author of technical books on pure mathematics and probability, including a collection of Schaum's Outlines
Abraham Nemeth (B.S. 1940), mathematician and inventor; developed the Nemeth Braille Code for Mathematics and Science Notation
Gloria Olive (B.A. 1944), New Zealand academic mathematician
Stanley Osher (B.A. 1962), pioneering mathematician in applied mathematics, computational science, and scientific computing
Donald Solitar (B.A. 1953), mathematician, known for his work in combinatorial group theory; the Baumslag–Solitar groups are named after him and Gilbert Baumslag, after their joint 1962 paper on these groups

Meteorology

Frank Field (B.S. 1947), meteorologist and science editor
Seymour Hess (B.A. 1941), meteorologist and planetary scientist
Lester Machta (B.A. 1939)  American meteorologist, first director of the Air Resources Laboratory (ARL) of the National Oceanic and Atmospheric Administration
Raphael Miranda (B.S. 2006), meteorologist and weather producer at WNBC in New York City

Physics
Alexander Calandra (B.A 1935), scientist, educator, and author, professor of physics at Washington University in St. Louis
Esther M. Conwell (B.S. 1942), physicist, contributed to development of semiconductors and lasers
Stanley Deser (B.S. 1949), physicist known for his contributions to general relativity, especially as co-developer of ADM formalism, Ancell Professor of Physics at Brandeis University
Robert Ehrlich (B.S. 1959), American particle physicist and educator; author of books about the tachyon, a hypothetical particle that travels faster than light
Jerry Goldstein (B.S. 1993), space physicist and professor
David L. Goodstein (B.S. 1960), physicist, educator, and Vice-Provost and Frank J. Gilloon Distinguished Teaching and Service Professor of the California Institute of Technology
Abraham Klein (B.A. 1947), theoretical physicist
Arthur Oliner (B.A. 1941), physicist and electrical engineer, best known for his contributions to engineering electromagnetics and antenna theory
Leon Pape (B.S. 1949),  medical physicist specializing in biophysics, radiological health physics, electron microscopy, and membrane biophysics
Charles M. Sommerfield (B.S. 1953), high-energy physicist and one of the namesakes of the Bogomol'nyi–Prasad–Sommerfield bound
Larry Spruch (B.A. 1943), physicist specializing in theoretical atomic physics and astrophysics
Sheldon Stone (B.S. 1967), physicist at Syracuse University best known for his work in experimental elementary particle physics, including the Large Hadron Collider beauty experiment
Martin Summerfield (B.S. 1936), physicist and rocket scientist, co-founder of Aerojet, and the inventor of regenerative cooling for liquid rocket engines

Psychiatry and Psychology
David Bakan (B.A. 1942), Professor of Psychology at the University of Chicago and York University
Robert A. Baron (B.A. 1964), Professor of Psychology and Wellington Professor of Management at Rensselaer Polytechnic Institute's Lally School of Management
William Breitbart (B.S. 1973), psychiatrist, leader in the fields of psychosomatic medicine, psycho-oncology, and palliative care
Jean Lau Chin (B.A. 1966), American clinical psychologist known for her work on diversity in leadership, cultural competence in mental health care, and Dean of the Gordon F. Derner School of Psychology at Adelphi University
Emory L. Cowen (B.A. 1944), psychologist who pioneered the promotion of wellness in mental health
Leah J. Dickstein (B.A. 1955, M.A. 1961), American psychiatrist; founder and president of the Association of Women Psychiatrists
Jack Drescher (B.A. 1972), psychiatrist and psychoanalyst known for his work on sexual orientation and gender identity
Charles Epstein (B.A. 1978), counseling psychologist; NYC hypnotherapist
Herbert J. Freudenberger (B.A. 1952), psychologist, first to describe the symptoms of exhaustion professionally and conduct a comprehensive study on burnout
Marvin Goldfried (B.A. 1957), psychologist, co-founder of the Society for the Exploration of Psychotherapy Integration
Howard E. Gruber (B.A. 1943), psychologist and pioneer of the psychological study of creativity
Howard S. Hoffman (M.A. 1953), experimental psychologist
David Kantor (B.A 1950, M.A. 1952), systems psychologist
Louise Kaplan (B.A. 1950), psychologist and psychoanalyst best known for her research into sexual perversion and fetishism
Saul Kassin (B.A. 1974), psychologist, author, and distinguished professor at John Jay College of Criminal Justice in New York
Herbert Kelman (B.A. 1947), professor of social ethics at Harvard University, known for his work on conflict resolution in the Middle East
Howard H. Kendler (B.A. 1940), psychologist who conducted research on latent and discrimination learning
Carol Nadelson (B.A. 1957), American psychiatrist; first female president of the American Psychiatric Association
Ira Progoff (B. A. 1941), psychotherapist, best known for his development of the Intensive Journal Method 
Leanne Rivlin (B.A. 1952), pioneer in environmental psychology
Milton Rokeach (B.A. 1941), professor of social psychology and developer of the Rokeach Value Survey
Julian Rotter (B.A. 1937), psychologist, pioneered research on locus of control
Francine Shapiro (B.A. 1968, MA, 1972), psychologist and educator who originated and developed EMDR
Irwin Silverman (B.A. 1958), professor of psychology at York University, best known for work in evolutionary psychology and sex differences in intelligence 
Roberta Temes (B.A. 1962), author, psychotherapist, and clinical hypnotist
Dorothy Tennov (B.A. 1950), psychologist, introduced the term "limerence" to describe the state of being in love
Hans Toch (B.A. 1952), prolific author and social psychologist involved in criminology and criminal justice administration
Rhoda Unger (B.A. 1960), feminist psychologist, pioneering figure in the Association for Women in Psychology
Beatrice A. Wright (B.A. 1938), psychologist known for her work in rehabilitation counseling
Philip Zimbardo (B.A. 1954), social psychologist and designer of the Stanford Prison Experiment

Other
Annette Aiello (B.A. 1972), entomologist at the Smithsonian Tropical Research Institute; specialist in butterflies
Seymour Benzer (B.A. 1942), physicist, molecular biologist and behavioral geneticist.
Baruch Brody (B.A. 1962), bioethicist and director of the Center for Ethics, Medicine and Public Issues at The Baylor College of Medicine
Wylie Burke (B.A. 1970), bioethicist and Professor Emerita at the University of Washington, authority on the translation of novel genomic technologies
Florence Comite (B.A. 1973), endocrinologist who has developed therapies for osteoporosis, endometriosis, fibroid disease, and infertility
Felice Frankel (B.S. 1966), photographer of scientific images who has received multiple awards, both for the aesthetic quality of her science photographs
Eli Friedman (B.S. 1953), nephrologist, inventor of the first portable dialysis machine
Herbert Friedman (B.S. 1936), pioneer in the use of sounding rockets to conduct research for solar physics, aeronomy, and astronomy; Wolf Prize in Physics
Leon Glass, (B.S. 1963), scientist; pioneered mathematical and physical methods to study biological systems, with special interest in vision, cardiac arrhythmia, and genetic networks
Aaron Goldberg (B.A. 1939), botanist; parasitologist; known for the Goldberg system, a treatise on the classification, evolution and phylogeny of the Monocotyledon and Dicotyledons
Madelyn Gould (B.A. 1972) is the Irving Philips Professor of Epidemiology in Psychiatry at Columbia University, notable for her study of youth suicide
Jay M. Gould, (B.A. 1936), statistician and epidemiologist, founded the Radiation and Public Health Project
Leonard Herzenberg (B.S. 1952), developed the fluorescence-activated cell sorter which revolutionized the study of cancer cells and is the basis for purification of adult stem cells; recipient of the Kyoto Prize in 2006
Howard W. Jaffe (B.A. 1942), geologist and mineralogist; a pioneer in the study of the crystal chemistry of rock-forming minerals
Edith Kaplan (B.A. 1949), creator of several important neuropsychological tests, including the Boston Diagnostic Aphasia Examination and the Boston Naming Test
Selna Kaplan (B.S. 1948), pediatric endocrinologist
Sol Katz (B.A. 1978), geologist, computer scientist, and early pioneer of Geospatial Free and Open Source Software
Joel S. Levine (B.S. 1964), planetary scientist at NASA, author, and research professor in applied science at the College of William & Mary
Stephen P. Maran (B.S. 1959), astronomer and popularizer; author of Astronomy for Dummies
Arthur Nowick (B.A. 1943), materials scientist
William E. Paul (B.A. 1956), immunologist and co-discoverer of interleukin 4
Fredy Peccerelli (B.S. 1996), forensic anthropologist, Director of the Guatemalan Forensic Anthropology Foundation
George Plafker (B.A. 1949), geologist and seismologist, known for pioneering research in subduction, tsunami, and the geology of Alaska
Estelle Ramey (B.A. 1936), endocrinologist, physiologist, and feminist
Michael Salzhauer (B.A. 1993), cosmetic and plastic surgeon, author and inventor
Joseph D. Schulman (B.S. 1962), specialist in human genetics and infertility; founder the Genetics & IVF Institute
Debra T. Silverman (B.A. 1970), biostatistician and epidemiologist specializing in bladder cancer epidemiology and the carcinogenicity of diesel exhaust
Henry Spira (B.A. 1958), pioneering animal rights activist
Dennis P. Tarnow (B.A. 1968), dentist and pioneer in implant research
Edward Taub (B.S. 1953), behavioral neuroscientist on faculty at the University of Alabama at Birmingham
Armin Tehrany (B.A. 1991), orthopaedic surgeon and film producer
Wolf V. Vishniac (B.A. 1945), microbiologist; inventor of the "Wolf Trap," which tests for the possibility of life existing on other planets; namesake of the crater Vishniac on Mars

Sports

Baseball
Hy Cohen, Major League Baseball pitcher for the Chicago Cubs
Saul Katz (B.A. 1960), President/CEO of the New York Mets
 Sam Nahem (attended 1933–35), Major League Baseball pitcher
Marius Russo (attended 1932–34), Major League Baseball pitcher for the New York Yankees (1939–43, 1946); All-Star in 1941
Eddie Turchin, Major League Baseball player
Richard Wilpon (B.A. 1960), Member of the New York Mets board of directors

Basketball
Alex Crisano, basketball player for the Philippine Patriots
Phil Farbman (1924–1996), basketball player in the Basketball Association of America (BAA) as a member of the Philadelphia Warriors and Boston Celtics
 Nat Frankel, basketball player in the Basketball Association of America (BAA) and the American Basketball League (ABL)
Fran Fraschilla (B.A. 1980), basketball coach at Manhattan College, St. John's University and University of New Mexico; now ESPN broadcast analyst
Bill Green (M.A. 1967), basketball All-American
Mel Hirsch (B.A. 1943), professional basketball player who played for the Boston Celtics, 1946–47
Marvin Kratter (1937), owner of Boston Celtics
Johnny Most (B.A. 1947), sports announcer; radio voice of the Boston Celtics
Tom Sealy, basketball player for the Harlem Globetrotters and in the National Basketball League

Chess

Gata Kamsky (B.A. 1999), Soviet-born American chess grandmaster, five-time U.S. Champion, current World Rapid Chess Champion, current US Chess Champion
Alex Lenderman (attended 2007–2009), Russian-American chess grandmaster; U16 (under 16 years old) 2005 world chess champion
Max Pavey (M.A. 1948), chess master
Raymond Weinstein (B.A. 1963), chess player and International Master; US Junior Chess Champion
Bernard Zuckerman, chess International Master

Soccer

Jonathan Akpoborie, Nigerian soccer player
Mirsad Huseinovic (attended 1988–92), Yugoslavian-born U.S. soccer player
Ernest Inneh, Nigerian-American soccer player
Antonio Superbia (B.S. 1994), retired Brazilian-American soccer player and coach.

Other
Karen Allison (B.A. 1961), American-Canadian bridge player, winner of five national championships
Donald Aronow (B.A. 1950), designer, builder and racer of the Cigarette, Donzi, and Formula speed boat
 Nikki Franke (B.S. 1972), Olympic foil fencer and fencing coach
Irma Garcia (M.S. 2001), athletics director at St. Francis College; first Latina athletic director in NCAA Division I sports
 Ralph Goldstein (1913–1997), Olympic épée fencer
Pearson Jordan (B.S. 1990), Barbadian sprinter who competed in the men's 100 metres at the 1976 Summer Olympics
Allie Sherman, (B.A. 1943), President of OTB; NFL player and coach of the New York Giants football team, 1961—68
Sydne Vogel (B.S. 2009), former competitive figure skater, 1997 World Junior champion

References

 
Brooklyn College
Brooklyn College alumni